The 2010–11 season was Kilmarnock's twelfth consecutive season in the Scottish Premier League, having competed in it since its inauguration in 1998–99. Kilmarnock also competed in the Scottish Cup and the League Cup.

Summary

Season
Kilmarnock finished fifth in the Scottish Premier League with 49 points. They reached the Quarter-Final of the League Cup, losing to Rangers and the fourth round of the 2010–11 Scottish Cup, also losing to Rangers.

Results and fixtures

Pre-season
Kilmarnock spent their pre-season in Devon, competing in the South West Challenge Cup with friendly matches against Bideford and Blackpool, followed by a record 16–0 win over local side Torrington F.C.

Scottish Premier League

Scottish League Cup

Scottish Cup

Squad statistics

Appearances

|-
|colspan="8"|Players who left the club during the 2010–11 season
|-

|}

Disciplinary record

Final League table

Division summary

Transfers

Players in

Players out

Notes and references

External links
 Kilmarnock F.C. website
 BBC My Club page

2010-11
Kilmarnock